Utan Panjang is an administrative village in the Kemayoran district of Indonesia. It has a postal code of 10650.

See also
 List of administrative villages of Jakarta

Administrative villages in Jakarta